Y S College is a co-educational institute of Maharaja Ranjit Singh Punjab Technical University located in Barnala district of Punjab, India. The college was established in 2012.

Affiliation and accreditation 
The college is affiliated to Maharaja Ranjit Singh Punjab Technical University, based in Bathinda.

Curriculum 
Y S College offers a number of undergraduate degrees:
 Bachelor of Science (B.Sc. IT)
 Bachelor of Mass Communication & Journalism
 Bachelor of Computer Application (B.C.A.)
 Bachelor of Commerce (B.Com.)

Infrastructure 
 Building
 Y S Auditorium 
 Computer & Software Skills Lab
 Library & Cafeteria
 Anti-Ragging Cell 
 Media Center

References 
 YS Group of Institutes, Barnala, Punjab
 Young Scholars Group of Institutes Barnala

Universities and colleges in Punjab, India
Barnala district
Educational institutions established in 2012
2012 establishments in Punjab, India